Þórarinn Benedikt Þorláksson (February 14, 1867 – July 10, 1924) was one of Iceland's first contemporary painters, the first Icelander to exhibit paintings in Iceland, and recipient of the first public grant that country made to a painter.

Early life and career 
Þórarinn was born in 1867, the 13th of 14 children of a clergyman father, who died when Þórarinn was just five years old. Originally trained and working as a bookbinder, Þórarinn studied painting under a Copenhagen-trained Icelandic woman, Thóra Thoroddsen. In 1900 he was awarded a grant by the Icelandic Parliament to study art in Denmark, and he trained there from 1895 to 1899. Returning to Iceland, he held an exhibition of his works at a place perplexingly called Glasgow, in Reykjavík, in the summer of 1900—the first exhibition of Icelandic painting in Iceland. Þórarinn's principal interest was landscape painting, and perhaps fittingly a dominant subject in this first exhibition of works was Þingvellir, a site of enormous historical significance to Icelanders as the site of their parliaments (which dated back to 930 AD).

Later career 

Þórarinn continued to paint, holding regular exhibitions until 1911. However, he required a regular income that could not be derived solely from his art. On December 30, 1913, he was appointed by Prime Minister Hannes Hafstein as one of the five people on the committee that designed the Flag of Iceland. He taught drawing at the Technical College and other institutions in Reykjavík, and was principal of that college from 1916 to 1922. He also ran a shop selling art materials, journals and books until his death. Throughout his life he continued to paint, particularly in the countryside during the summers, and it was at his own summerhouse, Birkihlíð, that he died on July 10, 1924.

Þórarinn, together with a small number of other artists including his contemporary Ásgrímur Jónsson, confronted and portrayed the landscape of their country on its terms and through Icelandic eyes, rather than through the conventions—and the light—of Western European artistic tradition. In this respect the work of Þórarinn and Ásgrímur played a role similar to that of the Heidelberg School in Australia (slightly earlier) and the Group of Seven, Emily Carr and Tom Thomson in Canada (a little later).

Selected paintings

References
This biography is based on Júliana Gottskálksdóttir's essay in Þórarinn B. Þorláksson: Pioneer at the Dawn of a Century (see below)

Reading
Ólafur Kvaran (ed.), Þórarinn B. Þorláksson: Pioneer at the Dawn of a Century, Listasafn Íslands, Reykjavík, 2000.
Ólafur Kvaran and Karla Kristjánsdóttir (eds), Confronting Nature: Icelandic Art of the 20th Century, National Gallery of Iceland, Reykjavík, 2001.

1867 births
1924 deaths
Landscape artists
20th-century Icelandic painters
20th-century male artists
Male painters